JetSmarter was a corporation and mobile application for private jet users. The company was headquartered in Fort Lauderdale, Florida, United States. The app connected users to available aircraft and routes in the United States, Europe and Middle East. The company was purchased by Vista Global in 2019 and merged into a new brand, XOJET Aviation.

History
JetSmarter was founded in 2012 by entrepreneur Sergey Petrossov, whose idea made him one of Forbes''' "30 Under 30" business leaders of 2016. In August 2012, the beta version was launched and tested among a closed group of private aviation users. After testing proved successful, Petrossov sought and received substantial venture funding to expand JetSmarter's scope.

In June 2015, JetSmarter announced its new European headquarters in Zurich, Switzerland. In early 2016, it launched flights within Europe. JetSmarter had offices in Zurich, London, Moscow, Dubai, Riyadh, and Fort Lauderdale.

On February 16, 2017, the President of Jetsmarter, Edward Gennady Barsky, resigned after he was arrested at the Broward Financial Center, site of the company's headquarters. He was charged with five counts of grand theft by embezzlement by authorities in Contra Costa, California.

On September 5, 2018, a JetSmarter shared charter flight from Las Vegas to New York had to make an emergency landing in North Platte, Nebraska, after a passenger threatened other passengers and the crew. The flight eventually continued to New York.

On April 10, 2019, Dubai-based Vista Global said it had made an agreement to acquire JetSmarter adding it to its aviation portfolio, which includes VistaJet and XOJET. Vista said it would maintain JetSmarter's office in Ft. Lauderdale where its digital team was based. 

On June 27, 2019, Vista Global announced it had combined JetSmarter with its XOJET subsidiary rebranding the combined entity as XO, powered by JetSmarter technology. 

Funding
According to Business Insider and TechCrunch, JetSmarter raised $20 million from the Saudi Royal Family, American rapper Jay-Z, American serial entrepreneur and investor Wayne Chang, and investment bank Goldman Sachs Capital Partners.

In December 2016, JetSmarter announced it had raised an additional $105 million at a $1.6 billion valuation. The company said this would fuel international expansion and add at least 80 more routes to its existing 50 routes.

In August 2017, JetSmarter said it had raised an undisclosed amount of institutional capital from Clearlake Capital, Leucadia National Corporation and existing investors. It said it would use the money to expand services, including routes and flight frequency.

Services
JetSmarter flight services included a mix of shared and private flights:
 Seats on existing jetpooling flights.
 On-demand shared flights. However, unlike the typical on-demand charter, buyers could not cancel or change flight times and in some cases the shared charter prices were similar to or even greater than a traditional charter, according to an analysis by Private Jet Card Comparisons.
 On-demand private flights.
 Helicopter transfers in select cities.
 Empty-leg flight deals, or repositioning flights.

JetSmarter claimed to offer 3,000 private jets and 2,000 free empty legs per month. In January 2016, Chicago Tribune reported that JetSmarter had launched app-based private charter service in Chicago, using Midway International Airport as its access point. Adding to its services, the company offered helicopter transfers in select cities.

In May 2018, JetSmarter announced it would have a fleet of 20 JetSmarter branded aircraft by the end of the year. The aircraft would be managed and operated by JetEdge, a Part 135 operator. It also said it had eliminated free shuttles and for new members, it had eliminated free flights under three hours. The company also said it was providing integration via SAP Concur to attract more corporate travel business.

Partnership
JetSmarter partnered with various air carriers that span the range of the private charter industry.
Partnerships included Pernod Ricard, Vertis Aviation, and SportStar Relocation. The company also partnered with Jet Edge and Air Hamburg to cater to its global community of private jet fliers.

Corporate affairs
In 2017, The Verge'' reported that management of JetSmarter offered free flights to its reporters if an article was posted within five days of the flight. According to the reporter if the story did not appear within that timeline, the reporter's credit card would be charged $2,000.

In August 2018, a Los Angeles-based former member of JetSmarter filed a lawsuit seeking at least $2 million in damages from JetSmarter after the company refused to renew his membership. He alleged misleading advertising on social media from Kim Kardashian and Petra Nemcova as well as deceptive sales tactics. In the same month, JetSmarter agreed to an undisclosed settlement after a New Jersey coupled filed a lawsuit alleging deceptive sales tactics. Their lawsuit included a text message from a JetSmarter sales representative promising free flights they allege were never provided.

In January 2019, CNBC aired an investigative report on JetSmarter, titled "Tailspin", stating that "JetSmarter tried to be the Uber of private jets, now it faces lawsuits, losses and security questions". The business news channel also published a letter from JetSmarter's general counsel attempting to quash its investigation. The report included a video of a JetSmarter flight that was diverted by a passenger making terroristic threats.

References

External links 

2012 establishments in Florida
Android (operating system) software
Companies based in Fort Lauderdale, Florida
IOS software
Jay-Z
Ridesharing companies of the United States